The bronze catfish (Netuma bilineata), also known as the giant catfish, the roundsnout sea catfish, or the two-line sea catfish, is a species of catfish in the family Ariidae. It was described by Achille Valenciennes in 1840, originally under the genus Bagrus. It inhabits marine, brackish and freshwaters throughout the Indo-western Pacific.

The diet of the bronze catfish includes detritus such as loose scales and carcasses, as well as prawns and other crustaceans, and sea urchins.

The bronze catfish is of minor interest to commercial fisheries.

References

Ariidae
Fish described in 1840